Greegor Peak is a peak  high  west-southwest of the summit of Mount Passel in the Denfeld Mountains of the Ford Ranges, in Marie Byrd Land, Antarctica. It was mapped by the United States Antarctic Service (1939–41) and by the United States Geological Survey from surveys and U.S. Navy air photos (1959–65). It was named by the Advisory Committee on Antarctic Names for David H. Greegor, a biologist with the United States Antarctic Research Program Marie Byrd Land Survey II, 1967–68.

References

Mountains of Marie Byrd Land